Hobbs in a Hurry is a 1918 American silent Western film directed by Henry King and starring William Russell, Henry A. Barrows, and Winifred Westover.

Cast
 William Russell as J. Warren Hobbs, Jr. 
 Henry A. Barrows as J. Warren Hobbs Sr. 
 Winifred Westover as Helen Renshaw 
 Richard Morris as Rufus Renshaw 
 Hayward Mack as Lord Willoughby / Louis Willoughby 
 Carl Stockdale as Angus MacDonald

References

Bibliography
 Donald W. McCaffrey & Christopher P. Jacobs. Guide to the Silent Years of American Cinema. Greenwood Publishing, 1999.

External links
 

1918 films
1918 Western (genre) films
Films directed by Henry King
1910s English-language films
Pathé Exchange films
American black-and-white films
Silent American Western (genre) films
1910s American films